Crooklyn is a 1994 American semi-autobiographical film produced and directed by Spike Lee and co-written with his sister Joie and brother Cinqué. Occurring in the Bedford–Stuyvesant neighborhood of Brooklyn, New York, during the summer of 1973, the film primarily focuses on a young girl named Troy Carmichael (played by Zelda Harris), and her family. Throughout the film, Troy learns life lessons through her rowdy brothers Clinton, Wendell, Nate, and Joseph; her loving but strict mother Carolyn (Alfre Woodard), and her naive, struggling father Woody (Delroy Lindo).

A distinctive characteristic of Crooklyn is its soundtrack, composed completely of music from the 1960s and 70s, except the hit single "Crooklyn" by the Crooklyn Dodgers, a rap crew composed of Buckshot, Masta Ace, and Special Ed. A two-volume release of the soundtrack became available on CD along with the release of the film.

Similarly to his past films such as School Daze, Do the Right Thing, and She's Gotta Have It, Spike Lee appears in Crooklyn, playing a young glue huffer named Snuffy, who likes to bully the local children.

Crooklyn is the second of only two films directed by Spike Lee to earn a PG-13 rating in the US, along with Malcolm X.

New Yorkers selected the film for simultaneous screenings across New York City as part of the 2017 One Film, One New York contest.

Plot
In 1973, nine-year-old Troy Carmichael and her brothers Clinton, Wendell, Nate, and Joseph live in the Bedford-Stuyvesant neighborhood of Brooklyn with their parents Woody, a struggling musician, and Carolyn, a schoolteacher. The neighborhood is filled with colorful characters, such as the Carmichaels' next-door neighbor Tony Eyes, whose house emits the foul smell of dog feces; Tommy La-La, who continuously sings and plays his electric keyboard; glue sniffers Snuffy and Right Hand Man; and war veteran Vic Powell, who lives upstairs and rents from the Carmichaels.

One day, the Carmichael children get into an argument with Tony after he witnesses Wendell throwing trash into his area, which escalates when Carolyn and several neighborhood children get involved and is defused when Vic comes downstairs and then punches Tony in the face. Troy, who has sneaked out to the corner store, sees Vic getting arrested as she leaves the store.

One night, Woody and Carolyn argue about money; Carolyn resents Woody for not appreciating their financial situation and using their money carelessly to fund his solo career. The argument escalates as Carolyn yells for the children to turn off the television, before later turning it off herself.

Clinton turns his back on Carolyn and she grabs him for disobeying. Woody then grabs her and carries her out of the room. Woody carries Carolyn out of the room and down the stairs and Nate jumps on Woody's back. The other children hold Carolyn and Carolyn hurts her ankle in the struggle.

Carolyn kicks Woody out of the house, but Woody later brings flowers to Carolyn and the two reconcile. The family then decides to go on a trip, but as they are leaving, a worker from Con Ed arrives to shut off the electricity due to an unpaid bill, postponing the trip and forcing the family to use candles for light.

A few days later, the family travels to the South to stay with affluent relatives. Troy stays with her cousin, Viola, who was adopted by Uncle Clem and Aunt Song. Troy has fun with Viola despite disliking her snobby Aunt Song and her dog, Queenie. On Troy's tenth birthday, she gets a letter from Carolyn. After reading the letter and dealing with constant bickering between Viola and Aunt Song, Troy decides she wants to go home.

When Troy returns to New York, her Aunt Maxine and Uncle Brown pick her up at the airport. Troy later learns her mother is in the hospital and is taken to see her.

Later that evening, Woody tells the kids that their mother has cancer and must stay in the hospital. The boys cry, but Troy remains stoic. Troy then begins filling in the mother role, while Carolyn remains in the hospital but later dies.

Afterwards, one of Troy's brothers wonders if they have to dress up for their mother's funeral. On the day of the funeral, Troy's Aunt Maxine coaxes her into trying on the new clothes she's brought, telling her it would make Carolyn proud. Troy calmly explains that her mother hates polyester and would never let her wear it then announces to Woody that she is not going to the funeral. After Woody explains that Carolyn would want them all together at church, Troy acquiesces.

At the house gathering after the funeral, Troy is withdrawn. Joseph comes inside crying, saying that Snuffy and Right Hand Man robbed him. Following her mother's wishes to protect her younger brother, Troy goes outside with a baseball bat and hits Snuffy, telling him to go sniff glue on his own block.

Early the next morning, Troy dreams she's hearing her mother's voice. She goes downstairs to see her father trying to kill a rat in the kitchen. Woody then tells her that it is all right to cry, saying that even Clinton has cried. Troy concludes that it is good that her mother's suffering has ended.

As the summer ends, the Carmichael family and their friends resume their lives. Troy assumes the matriarch role that Carolyn left behind. Carolyn's spirit continues to visit Troy, praising her for taking on such responsibilities.

Cast

In addition, RuPaul makes his feature film debut playing Connie, a woman customer dancing with another customer at the bodega. While co-screenwriter and actor Joie Susannah Lee is shown in the opening credits as one of the actors, she does not appear in the cast closing credits scroll, though she does appear in the filmmakers closing credits scroll.

Development and production
The concept and story for Crooklyn were created by Joie Lee, her first screenplay. She then sold it to her older brother, Spike Lee, to direct and film. There was said to be creative and financial conflict between the siblings (Spike Lee, Joie Lee, and Cinqué Lee), who all were credited as co-writers. Joie Lee had major creative direction in the movie's production through casting and advising actors according to her accounts of her childhood, and even playing the role of Aunt Maxine in the movie.

Spike Lee was signed to a multiyear deal with Universal Studios, giving them the first look at buying any of his films, and in March 1993 they approved production for Crooklyn, which would be the first one made under this deal. Lee co-wrote the script with two of his siblings, basing the story of the mother's illness on their own life experience. Zelda Harris was cast for the role of Troy through an open audition process. For the music in the film, Lee picked all the songs himself, choosing ones from his childhood. The filming took place on location in New York, including Fort Greene Park.

During the scenes of the film that take place in the South, the shots were filmed with an anamorphic lens in such a way to give a squeezed appearance, illustrating the alienated feelings Troy was having in a place very strange to her. During the original run of the film, audience members were confused by these squeezed images, assuming there was some kind of technical error, so the studio put up signs in the theaters to explain the effect was intentional.

Themes and Analysis 
Crooklyn depicts themes of black girlhood and coming of age through the narrative of Director, Spike Lee's sister, Joie Lee, and her own story of growing up with brothers in Brooklyn. The story of Crooklyn also focuses on themes of loss, family, nostalgia, memory, youth, and the black experience. 

Lee uses elements of docufiction and a character-driven plot to showcase the everyday life of a family in New York. He considers the movie to be more of a reflection and break-down of what was experienced to the extent of Joie, Cinque, and his own understanding as children. The film focuses on the emotional and literal details of family life through depictions of various nuances from Troy's perspective. Film critics further mention how Crookyln depicts themes of change and connection, that can come with the death of someone close, as exhibited in the film when Carolyn dies and relationships and dynamics shift in the Carmichael household and beyond.

Release and reception
Crooklyn premiered at the San Francisco International Film Festival on May 12, 1994. It was released to theaters in May 1994, and debuted at number three at the box office.

When the film was released, Janet Maslin of The New York Times wrote, "Messy as the semiautobiographical Crooklyn often is, it succeeds in becoming a touching and generous family portrait, a film that exposes welcome new aspects of this director's talent." Variety's Todd McCarthy called the film "both annoying and vibrant, casually plotted and deeply personal," adding that it "ends up being as compelling as it is messy". Roger Ebert gave the film three-and-a-half stars, stating, "Lee's wonderful opening title sequence shows the children's street games that flourished in Brooklyn in the 1970s. Today, he says, those games have died, and he had to teach them to the actors who played the children. They have died because the kids in comparable neighborhoods today are afraid to go outside and play in the streets. Crooklyn is not in any way an angry film. But thinking about the difference between its world and ours can make you angry, and I think that was one of Lee's purposes here."

In a 2018 Variety article looking back on Lee's filmography, Joe Leydon ranked Crooklyn at ninth place: "At once street smart and sweetly sentimental, this warmly nostalgic coming-of-age drama could be described as a Spike Lee movie for people who normally dislike Spike Lee movies." As of April 2022, Crooklyn holds a rating of 78% on Rotten Tomatoes based on 32 reviews. The site's consensus reads, "A personal project that warmly reflects on Spike Lee's childhood, Crooklyn is an episodic celebration of family and the inedible facets of one's hometown".

Soundtrack

Year-end lists 
 Honorable mention – Dan Craft, The Pantagraph
 Honorable mention – Dennis King, Tulsa World
 Honorable mention – Duane Dudek, Milwaukee Sentinel
 10th worst – John Hurley, Staten Island Advance

Legacy
In the 2017 "One Film, One New York" contest, New Yorkers selected the film for free, simultaneous screenings across all five New York City boroughs.

References

External links
 
 
 

1994 films
1990s coming-of-age comedy-drama films
40 Acres and a Mule Filmworks films
African-American comedy-drama films
American coming-of-age comedy-drama films
American independent films
American biographical films
Films about drugs
Films directed by Spike Lee
Films set in Brooklyn
Films set in 1973
Hood comedy films
Films with screenplays by Spike Lee
Films scored by Terence Blanchard
Universal Pictures films
1994 independent films
1990s English-language films
1990s American films